Mount Aklim, Jbel Aklim, is a mountain of the Souss-Massa region of Morocco. Its altitude is 2,531 m.

It is located in the Anti-Atlas near the villages of Ameskar and Timguedert, Taroudant Province.

Panorama

See also 
 Anti-Atlas

References 

Mountains of Morocco
Geography of Souss-Massa